The Vienna University of Economics and Business (WU) is a public research university in Vienna, Austria, the largest university focusing on business, management and economics in Europe. It has been ranked as one of the best business schools in Europe and received Triple accreditation (AACSB, EQUIS and AMBA). Vienna University of Economics and Business ranked 36th among more than 13,000 universities worldwide offering degrees in Business & Management in the 2022 QS World University Rankings by subject.

History

WU was founded on 1 October 1898 as k.u.k. Exportakademie (in English: Export Academy) to provide professional training to future businessmen and thus stimulate the Austro-Hungarian empire's economy. From humble beginnings as a professional school, it quickly grew to become an important institution, which was awarded the status of a fully-fledged Hochschule (an educational institution equivalent to a university, but specializing in a certain field such as technology or business or art) in 1919. At that time, it was renamed to Hochschule für Welthandel. The course of studies leading to the academic degree of Diplomkaufmann provided training preparing for the export and banking businesses and was very practical, comprising courses in business administration, economics, law and others.
In 1930, the Hochschule für Welthandel was granted the right to issue doctoral degrees.

After World War II, the Hochschule für Welthandel increased its breadth in research. It started to become a very important institution in Austrian society at that time; most Austrian managers and many politicians received their university education here.
From 1966 onward, it began to offer a more theoretical course of studies in economics. In 1975, it was renamed to Wirtschaftsuniversität Wien. At the same time, the number of students began to increase dramatically. In 1983, it moved to a campus in Vienna's 9th District. Due to further increasing student numbers during the 1990s the campus became too small. As a result, new university grounds had to be built in Vienna's 2nd district. The new Campus WU opened in October 2013, next to the Vienna Fair Ground.

Leadership
In January 2015, Edeltraud Hanappi-Egger was elected rector of WU. She is the first woman in the history of the University to be elected rector. Her term began on 1 October 2015.

WU today
Today, WU has more than 20,000 students and over 400 researchers and lecturers, among those about 90 full professors. It 
increasingly draws students from outside Austria, mostly from Central and Eastern Europe. Most of the faculty are of Austrian or German nationality.

New campus

The new location is dubbed "Campus WU" and had its groundbreaking ceremony in October 2009. Close to the Prater public park, and next to the exhibition centre of Vienna, the campus features 6 main building complexes resting on approximately 25 acres (10 ha). The master plan was created by BUSarchitektur under the guidance of the architect Laura P. Spinadel. The buildings of the campus are designed by architectural firms from Spain, the United Kingdom, Germany, Japan and Austria. The dominant element of the campus is the Library & Learning Center, which was planned by Zaha Hadid.

Construction began in June 2010 and paved the way for the largest campus for business sciences in Europe. With a total investment of 492 million Euros and a planned construction period of 3 years, the project was concluded in 2013. Campus WU is situated close to the public transport hub Praterstern and is serviced by two stations of the underground line U2 and a number of buses.

The LLC has five cores, each with a different complex geometry. The core walls are inclined at different angles and so are the corners which are also rounded with different radii. MEVA has developed and uses both standard and special formwork, or a combination of both, to meet the forming requirements for these complex building parts. Steel formwork, for example, is used for rounded corners if required for structural reasons. Trapezoidal areas of inclined cylindrical corner areas are poured with special Mammut 350 wall formwork panels and special designs of MEVA’s circular column formwork Circo are used for the tilted and rounded corners.

The WU moved to the new site in September 2013, which is located at Welthandelsplatz 1, 1020 Vienna, Austria.

Research
Researchers at WU work in the following fields:
 Business Administration and all its branches
 Economics
 Law
 Linguistics, focus on Business Communication
 Socioeconomics
 Mathematics and Statistics
 Economic History and Economic Geography

With students in Austria being free to choose at which university they enroll, WU has become the most popular business and economics university in Vienna and in Austria.

Studies
Due to its large size, WU is able to offer a very broad range of electives which is probably unparalleled anywhere in the German speaking region.
Beginning in Fall 2006, WU began to modify its study programs to a bachelor/master/doctor system in order to align them with the Bologna Process.

English-taught master's programs:
 Digital Economy
 Economics
 International Management (CEMS)
 Marketing
 Quantitative Finance
 Socio-Ecological Economics and Policy
 Strategy, Innovation and Management Control
 Supply Chain Management

As at any Austrian or German university, scholars can also achieve a Habilitation at WU.

Furthermore, several courses in continuing education are offered (e.g. in marketing and sales, tourism management, logistics & supply chain management).

International Office (IO) 
The International Office (IO) of the Vienna University of Economics and Business is a service institution for students, staff and faculty of this university. As a team, the International Office (IO) administers international exchange and creates new opportunities for internationalization in studying and teaching.

Thanks to numerous partnerships and worldwide cooperations, many paths are open to members of Vienna University of Economics and Business. In addition to the semester abroad, double degree programs, international summer universities and Erasmus funding for internships abroad are also possible. Short study programs, such as Central Europe Connect (CEC), and online learning initiatives can also be found in the portfolio of the International Office (IO).

Rankings and Accreditations
In 2009 Vienna University of Economics and Business was ranked as one of the best business schools in the German-speaking countries according to Handelsblatt and in 2011 it was ranked 21st in the list of the 392 worldwide leading higher education institutions by the Mines ParisTech: Professional Ranking of World Universities. The study obtained the higher education career of the CEOs of the world's leading 500 companies.

WU was ranked 42nd in the "European Business School Ranking 2014" by Financial Times. The Global Executive MBA Program by WU Executive Academy was ranked 44th in the "Executive MBA Ranking 2015" by Financial Times.

The university's master in international management program was ranked 8th in the "Masters in Management Ranking 2016" by Financial Times.

The university is part of the respected consortium of Europe's leading schools and corporate partners – Community of European Management Schools (CEMS).

WU has achieved accreditation from the London-based Association of MBAs (AMBA), Brussels-based EQUIS and Tampa-based Association to Advance Collegiate Schools of Business (AACSB International). Only 72 business universities worldwide can claim triple crown accreditation by EQUIS, AACSB, and AMBA.

In September 2020 the Master Program Strategy, Innovation and Management Control achieved the 10th place in the QS Masters in Management Ranking making it the highest ranked Management Master program in the German speaking region.

Notable faculty
Gustaf Neumann
Christoph Badelt
Christoph Grabenwarter
Edeltraud Hanappi-Egger
Manfred M. Fischer
Renate Meyer
Ewald Nowotny
Bodo Schlegelmilch
Clive Spash
Wolfgang Lutz
Gabriel Felbermayr

Notable alumni
Politicians
Thomas Klestil (1932–2004), Austrian President (1992–2004)
Franz Vranitzky (1937– ), Austrian Chancellor (1986–1997)
Ferdinand Lacina (1942– ), Austrian Finance Minister (1986–1995)
Hannes Androsch (1938– ), Austrian Finance Minister (1970–1981) and Vice-Chancellor (1976–1981)
Christoph Chorherr (1960– ), Green Party Spokesperson (1996–1997)
Madeleine Petrovic (1956– ), Green Party Spokesperson (1994–1996)
Wolf Klinz, Liberal Party member of the European Parliament (2004–present)
Petra Steger, Freedom Party of Austria member of the National Council
Christoph Meineke (1979– ), Mayor
Andreas Salcher (1960– )
Sixtus Lanner (1934–2022), Austrian MP
Ilona Graenitz (1943–2022), Austrian MP and MEP

Entrepreneurs and managers
Max Auschnitt (1888–1957), Chairman of Iron Domains and Factory and Titan-Nădrag-Călan
Peter Brabeck-Letmathe (1944– ), Chairman and CEO Nestlé AG
Oskar Deutsch (born 1963), entrepreneur and President of the Jewish Community of Vienna 
Hikmet Ersek (1954– ), CEO Western Union
Hans-Peter Haselsteiner (1944– ), CEO Strabag SE
Peter Löscher (1957– ), CEO Siemens AG (2007–2013)
Dietrich Mateschitz (1944–2022), Founder & CEO Red Bull
Wolfgang Porsche (1943– ), Chairman of Porsche AG, Porsche SE and Volkswagen AG supervisory boards
Claus Raidl (1942– ), former CEO Böhler-Uddeholm, President Oesterreichische Nationalbank
Christopher Schläffer (1969– ), CDO VEON
 Erman Ilıcak, President of  Rönesans Holding, ranked 1st in Forbes Turkey’s “100 Wealthiest Turks” list in 2019.

Diplomats
 Zygmunt Vetulani (1894–1941), Consul General of the Republic of Poland in Baghdad and Rio de Janeiro

Historians
 Juan Friede (1901–1990), Muisca scholar and historian of Colombia

Public Institutions
Maria Schaumayer (1931–2013), President Oesterreichische Nationalbank (1990–1995)

Notes

External links 
 Official Website
 WU Executive Academy
 architecture for the new building
 FT Ranking 2009
 Handelsblatt Ranking 2009

 
Buildings and structures in Leopoldstadt
Universities and colleges in Vienna
Business schools in Austria
Educational institutions established in 1898
1898 establishments in Austria